Phalangist Party may refer to:
FET y de las JONS (English: Traditionalist Spanish Phalanx of the Committees of the National Syndicalist Offensive), the sole legal party of the Francoist dictatorship in Spain
Kataeb Party, a Christian right-wing political party in Lebanon